Isles & Glaciers was an American post-hardcore supergroup formed in 2008. They recorded material for their debut EP, The Hearts of Lonely People December 3–13, 2008 in Seattle, Washington and again in April 2009. It was produced by Casey Bates, and was released on March 9, 2010. Even though vocalist Craig Owens stated that the group will not be collaborating or releasing new material again, Vic Fuentes stated that the band may release more material in the future.

History
Isles & Glaciers was first rumored to exist after Craig Owens (Chiodos, Destroy Rebuild Until God Shows) and Jonny Craig (Dance Gavin Dance, Emarosa) performed a show in Lexington, Kentucky on August 30, 2008. Owens confirmed the rumors on September 4, 2008. Alternative Press announced the project officially and released the band's final lineup on December 15, 2008.

On January 18, 2009, both Owens and Brian Southall premiered three rough demos, "Clush", "Hills Like White Elephants", and "Empty Sighs and Wine", for an upcoming EP, and took part in an interview with 89X Radio in Windsor, Canada.

Isles & Glaciers played their first and only scheduled live show on March 21, 2009, which was presented by Alternative Press at Emo's Bar in Austin, Texas for a free show during SXSW. In an interview done by DJ Rossstar on Stickam, Craig Owens stated that members in the band want to perform future shows in random locations, such as Alaska.

Their debut EP, The Hearts of Lonely People, was released on March 9, 2010. A remix was released on November 11, 2014.

Band members
 Jonny Craig – vocals
 Vic Fuentes – rhythm guitar, vocals 
 Mike Fuentes – drums
 Matt Goddard – bass guitar
 Nick Martin – lead guitar, backing vocals
 Craig Owens – vocals
 Brian Southall – guitars, keyboards

Timeline

Discography
 The Hearts of Lonely People (2010) – U.S. Billboard 200 number 104
 The Hearts of Lonely People (Remixes) (2014)

References

External links
Isles And Glaciers on Equal Vision Records Official Website

American supergroups
Musical groups established in 2008
Musical groups from Michigan
American post-hardcore musical groups
Equal Vision Records artists
Pierce the Veil
2008 establishments in Michigan